West Miami is a city in Miami-Dade County, Florida, United States. The population was 7,233 at the 2020 census, up from 5,965 in 2010.

Geography
It is bordered to the north by Miami, to the east by Coral Gables, and to the south and west by unincorporated Coral Terrace.

Surrounding areas
  Flagami (Miami)
 Flagami (Miami)    Flagami (Miami)
  Coral Terrace   Coral Gables
  Coral Terrace    Coral Gables
  Coral Terrace

History
The city of West Miami, which is less than three-quarters of a square mile in area, is nestled between Tamiami Trail and Coral Way. Among early suggested names for the city were West Haven and West Gate.

Incorporated as a town with 700 residents, West Miami had 5,965 residents as of the 2010 census. 90.2% of the population was Hispanic or Latino. West Miami is surrounded by its larger neighbors, Coral Gables and Miami.

Demographics

2020 census

As of the 2020 United States census, there were 7,233 people, 2,632 households, and 1,793 families residing in the city.

2010 census

As of 2010, there were 2,180 households, out of which 4.4% were vacant. In 2000, 26.9% had children under the age of 18 living with them, 54.3% were married couples living together, 17.3% had a female householder with no husband present, and 23.0% were non-families. 18.3% of all households were made up of individuals, and 10.7% had someone living alone who was 65 years of age or older.  The average household size was 2.80 and the average family size was 3.14.

In the city, the population was spread out, with 18.4% under the age of 18, 5.9% from 18 to 24, 27.7% from 25 to 44, 22.5% from 45 to 64, and 25.6% who were 65 years of age or older.  The median age was 43 years. For every 100 females, there were 83.3 males.  For every 100 females age 18 and over, there were 81.3 males.

2000 census
In 2000, the median income for a household in the city was $34,910, and the median income for a family was $39,000. Males had a median income of $26,875 versus $26,013 for females. The per capita income for the city was $17,850.  About 7.6% of families and 9.5% of the population were below the poverty line, including 14.3% of those under age 18 and 7.4% of those age 65 or over.

As of 2000, Spanish as a first language was at 87.39% of residents, while English spoken as the mother tongue was 12.61% of the population.

Public transportation 
City of West Miami Bus Route & Timetable

Notable people
 Marco Rubio, U.S. senator, served as West Miami city commissioner

Crime
The number of violent crimes recorded by the FBI in 2003 was 22, with no homicides. The violent crime rate was 3.6 per 1,000 people.

References

External links
 
 City-data.com Profile

Cities in Miami-Dade County, Florida
Cities in Florida
Cities in Miami metropolitan area
Populated places established in 1947
1947 establishments in Florida